Musenyi is a village in the Commune of Tangara in Ngozi Province in north Burundi.

References

External links
Satellite map at Maplandia.com
 Source du Nil, Musenyi, Burundi. Monument to Burundi's southernmost source of the Nile, at Atlas Obscura
 

Populated places in Burundi
Bubanza Province